Guri (also Romanized as Gūrī; also known as Gorūh) is a village in Bizaki Rural District, Golbajar District, Chenaran County, Razavi Khorasan Province, Iran. At the 2006 census, its population was 63, in 17 families.

References 

Populated places in Chenaran County